Andrew Comyn (born 2 August 1968) is an English former professional footballer who played in the Football League for Aston Villa, Derby County, Plymouth Argyle and West Bromwich Albion.

Playing career
Comyn joined Manchester United's youth team at the age of 16. He was released by the club without playing for the first team and, after writing to a number of clubs in the Midlands, was offered a contract by Aston Villa.  He subsequently played for Derby County, Plymouth Argyle and West Bromwich Albion before leaving the professional game and playing semi-professionally for Hednesford Town and Halesowen Town.

Subsequent career
During his playing career, Comyn undertook a course in book-keeping. In the latter stages of his playing career, he began working at an accountancy firm owned by John Baldwin, the manager of Hednesford Town.  After retiring from playing, he worked for a number of leading accountancy companies, and in 2015 was appointed as vice-principal for financial strategy and control at Dudley College.

References

External links
 

English footballers
English Football League players
1968 births
Living people
Alvechurch F.C. players
Aston Villa F.C. players
Derby County F.C. players
Plymouth Argyle F.C. players
West Bromwich Albion F.C. players
Hednesford Town F.C. players
Halesowen Town F.C. players
Association football defenders